Douglas Frantz (born September 29, 1949 in North Manchester, Indiana) is an American Pulitzer Prize-winning former investigative journalist and author, and served as the Deputy Secretary-General of the Organisation for Economic Co-operation and Development from 2015 to 2017.

He resigned as Los Angeles Times Managing Editor in 2007 after blocking the publication of an article about the Armenian genocide; Frantz said his resignation was not related to the ensuing controversy.

Career 
Frantz graduated from DePauw University in 1971 and earned a M.S. from the Columbia University Graduate School of Journalism. He was an investigative reporter for the Los Angeles Times, the Chicago Tribune, and The New York Times.

Frantz served as the Istanbul bureau chief for The New York Times, and the managing editor of the Los Angeles Times from 2005 to 2007. Frantz was chief investigator for the Senate Foreign Relations Committee. He is also the former Managing Director of Kroll’s Business Intelligence Washington office.

From 2013 to 2015, Frantz served as the State Department's Assistant Secretary of State for Public Affairs.

Armenian genocide controversy 
As the Los Angeles Times Managing Editor, Frantz blocked a story on the Armenian genocide in April 2007 written by Mark Arax, a veteran Times journalist of Armenian descent. Frantz argued that Arax previously had expressed an opinion on the topic and therefore was biased on the subject, apparently referring to a letter co-signed by Arax that endorsed the LA Times policy of referring to the event as "Armenian Genocide". Arax, who has published similar articles before, lodged a discrimination complaint and threatened a federal lawsuit. Frantz was accused of having a bias obtained while being stationed in Istanbul, Turkey. Frantz resigned from the paper on July 6.

Personal 
Frantz has written 10 nonfiction books, six of them with his wife, Catherine Collins. Their most recent book, Fallout, dealt with nuclear weapons trafficking and the CIA, and was listed by The Guardian as one of the 10 top espionage books in history. They live in a fishing village in Nova Scotia.

Awards 
 1993; 1998 Pulitzer Prize for National Reporting finalist
 1993 Goldsmith Prize for Investigative Reporting

Works 
 John C. Boland, Douglas Frantz (1985). Wall Street's Insiders: How You Can Profit With The Smart Money. William Morrow & Co. .
 Douglas Frantz (1987). Levine & Co.: Wall Street's Insider Trading Scandal. Henry Holt & Co. .
 Douglas Frantz (1991). Making It : The Business of Building in the Age of Money. Holt. .
 Douglas Frantz, Catherine Collins (1990). Selling Out : How We Are Letting Japan Buy Our Land, Our Industries, Our Financial Institutions, and Our Future. McGraw-Hill. .
 Catherine Collins, Douglas Frantz (1993). Teachers : Talking Out of School. Little, Brown and Company. .
 Douglas Frantz (1993). From the Ground Up: The Business of Building in the Age of Money. University of California Press. .
 Douglas Frantz, David McKean (1995). Friends in High Places: The Rise and Fall of Clark Clifford. Little, Brown and Company. .
 
 
 
 Douglas Frantz, Catherine Collins (2008). The Man from Pakistan: The True Story of the World's Most Dangerous Nuclear Smuggler. Twelve. .

References

External links 

 
 

1949 births
American investigative journalists
American newspaper journalists
Chicago Tribune people
Columbia University Graduate School of Journalism alumni
DePauw University alumni
Living people
Los Angeles Times people
The New York Times writers
United States Assistant Secretaries of State